Adhikar is a 1986 Indian Hindi-language film starring Rajesh Khanna and Tina Munim. It is about struggles of a father to bring up his child while the rich mother has walked out of his life. 

A box office success, it had good music by Bappi Lahiri. In 1992, Ram Awatar Agnihotri wrote that it was in the films Alag Alag and Adhikar, both opposite Rajesh Khanna that Tina Munim showed the "first sparks" of the dedicated actress she would become. Tina regards her performance in this film as her best performance in her career. This was the last film which featured Rajesh Khanna and Tina Munim onscreen together, thus ending their popular pairing.

Plot 
Vishal (Rajesh Khanna) is a former champion jockey. Due to failing health, his doctor has advised him to give up racing, which he does.  He lives in a small house with his young son, Lucky. Both of them lead a humble lifestyle, yet they love each other dearly. Lucky grows up to believe that his mother has died, and when he asks Vishal about his mother, it is revealed that Vishal fell in love with a wealthy girl called Jyoti (Tina Munim) during his days as a champion jockey. Jyoti and Vishal marry and live together. Jyoti is an excellent singer and some music directors offer her the chance to sing in their films. However, Vishal is adamant that Jyoti will remain a housewife, and look after their son. When Jyoti sneaks off to the recording studio when Lucky is ill, Vishal furiously drags her home and hits her. He firmly tells her that she shall have to choose between singing and being a wife. This causes Jyoti to leave her house and move in with her selfish mother (Bindu). Although she takes Lucky with her, Vishal kidnaps him and it's also revealed that Jyoti and her family informed the police, causing Vishal to move far away with Lucky to a smaller house.

Jyoti, now a very successful singer, re-enters Lucky's life as his 'aunty'. Vishal works as a servant in a wealthy man's house. His boss's spoilt sister, Rita (Zarina Wahab) takes an interest in Vishal and is determined to marry him. When Rita visits Vishal's house, Lucky does not like her and he misbehaves with her, causing Rita to run away. When his boss demands that Lucky beg Rita for forgiveness, Vishal quits his job. Lucky, unaware that Jyoti is his mother, plans to introduce her to Vishal. This leads to Jyoti realising that Lucky is her son, but Vishal firmly tells her to stay away.

Jyoti takes Vishal to court for a custody hearing. In order to pay for a good lawyer (Danny Denzongpa), Vishal is forced to sell Lucky's horse, Hira to his former boss. However, Vishal meets with an accident and misses the first day in court. The court orders that Jyoti be permitted to meet Lucky once a week. When Vishal finds Lucky at Jyoti's house, he takes him away, telling him that Jyoti plans to separate them, leading Lucky to sever ties with Jyoti, shattering her.

During the custody hearing, Vishal's lawyer tears Jyoti apart on the stand. Unable to tolerate his wife's insult, Vishal emotionally agrees to hand Lucky over to Jyoti. This makes Jyoti fall in love with Vishal again and she quits singing, and decides to return to Vishal. One day, Lucky sees Vishal's boss abuse Hira, and as he begs him to stop, Vishal arrives and beats his boss up, which leads to his arrest. Lucky is sent to live with Jyoti, who reveals to him that she is his mother, but he doesn't believe her.

When Vishal is released from jail, Lucky asks him to participate in a horse race, atop Hira, whom Jyoti has brought back. Vishal reluctantly agrees and wins the race. However, this makes Vishal unconscious. In his last moments, Vishal tells Lucky that their journey together was only meant to last until this point. Vishal loses consciousness again. However, Lucky's prayers bring him back. Vishal confirms that Jyoti, who is also there, is indeed Lucky's mother. Vishal shares an emotional embrace with Lucky and Jyoti. The film ends with Jyoti, Vishal and Lucky leading a happy family life together.

Cast 

Rajesh Khanna as Vishal
Tina Munim as Jyoti
Zarina Wahab as Rita
Bindu as Jyoti's Mother
Sulochana Latkar as Mausi Ji
Danny Denzongpa as Vishal's Lawyer
Tanuja
Raza Murad as J.K.
 Murad as Judge
Yunus Parvez as Baake mama, Baakelal
Chand Usmani as Doctor
Vikas Anand as Doctor Sharma
Paintal as Mohanlal, Music Director 
Praveen Kumar Sobti
Moolchand
Birbal as Ganeshan, Jyoti's Servant 
Gurbachan Singh

Music 
 "Main Dil Tu Dhadkan" – Kishore Kumar
 "Shuru Shuru Pyar Ki Kahani" – Kishore Kumar, Chandrani Mukherjee
 "Jane Wale Na Dil Se Jate" – Lata Mangeshkar
 "Main Dil Tu Dhadkan" – Kavita Krishnamurthy
 "Jeene Ka Sahara Milgayai" – Uttara Kelkar
 "Laher Laher Chanchal Huyee" – Anupama Deshpande

References

External links 
 

1986 films
1986 romantic drama films
Indian family films
Indian romantic drama films
1980s Hindi-language films
Films scored by Bappi Lahiri
Fictional portrayals of police departments in India